Mohamed Bouldini (born 27 November 1995) is a Moroccan footballer who plays as a forward for Spanish club Levante UD.

Club career
Born in Casablanca, Bouldini signed for Botola club Raja CA in 2015. Unwanted, he moved in January 2018 to Ittihad Tanger in the same league, for a fee of 1 million Moroccan dirhams. After six goalless games, his contract was rescinded.  Following a trial, he signed a one-year deal with Portuguese LigaPro side U.D. Oliveirense in July 2018.

On 27 August 2020, Bouldrini signed for Académica de Coimbra of the same league. With 13 goals over the season, he ranked second to F.C. Vizela's Cassiano. On 23 November, he scored the only goal of a home win over Varzim S.C. in the third round of the Taça de Portugal.

Bouldini signed a three-year contract with Primeira Liga club C.D. Santa Clara on 18 June 2021. The following 8 January, after featuring sparingly, he was loaned to Spanish Segunda División side CF Fuenlabrada for the remainder of the season.

On 29 June 2022, despite Fuenlas relegation, the club exercised his buyout clause. On 23 August, however, he moved to second division side Levante UD on a five-year contract.

International career
In August 2015, while at Raja, Bouldini was a surprise call-up for the Morocco national team under manager Ezzaki Badou, for a 2017 Africa Cup of Nations qualifier against São Tomé and Príncipe. He did not play in the 3–0 away win on 5 September.

Career statistics

Honours
Ittihad Tanger
Botola: 2017–18

References

External links

1995 births
Living people
Footballers from Casablanca
Moroccan footballers
Association football forwards
Raja CA players
Ittihad Tanger players
U.D. Oliveirense players
Associação Académica de Coimbra – O.A.F. players
C.D. Santa Clara players
CF Fuenlabrada footballers
Levante UD footballers
Botola players
Liga Portugal 2 players
Primeira Liga players
Segunda División players
Moroccan expatriate footballers
Expatriate footballers in Portugal
Expatriate footballers in Spain
Moroccan expatriate sportspeople in Portugal
Moroccan expatriate sportspeople in Spain